Mycena strobilinoides, commonly known as the scarlet fairy helmet, is a species of agaric fungus in the family Mycenaceae. It is found in North America, where it fruits scattered or in dense groups on needle beds and moss. The mushroom is more common in western than eastern North America, and is also present in Europe. It has amyloid, ellipsoid spores measuring 7–9 by 4–5 μm.

The fruit bodies are bright orange, most intensely on the edge of the gills. The stem is covered with long orange hairs.

References

External links

strobilinoides
Fungi described in 1893
Fungi of North America
Taxa named by Charles Horton Peck